is a Japanese suspense manga series written and illustrated by Haro Aso. It was first serialized in Shogakukan's shōnen manga magazine Shōnen Sunday S from November 2010 to March 2015, and later moved to Weekly Shōnen Sunday, where it ran from April 2015 to March 2016. Its chapters were collected in 18 tankōbon volumes. Alice in Borderland was adapted into a three-episode original video animation (OVA), released from October 2014 to February 2015.

A spin-off series, Alice on Border Road, illustrated by Takayoshi Kuroda, was serialized in Shogakukan's seinen manga magazine Monthly Sunday Gene-X from August 2015 to February 2018, with its chapters collected in eight tankōbon volumes. A sequel, written and illustrated by Aso, Alice in Borderland: Retry, was serialized in Weekly Shōnen Sunday from October 2020 to January 2021, with its chapters collected in two tankōbon volumes. A live-action television series adaptation, produced by Netflix and directed by Shinsuke Satō, premiered worldwide with an eight-episode first season in December 2020; it was followed by an eight-episode second season in December 2022.

Plot
Ryohei Arisu is a young man who struggles to connect with his family and spends time hanging out with his friends, Daikichi Karube and Chōta Segawa. Arisu and Chota are often immature and do not try at school, whilst Karube manages a bar and urges the two to get their lives together. The trio are at a train station when they see fireworks so blinding they have to cover their eyes, and when they open them they find themselves back in Karube's bar, which is now abandoned and all of the buildings covered in vegetation. The trio get drunk and play games together, but Karube becomes worried and urges the pair to take things seriously. After stepping into what seems to be an empty festival, they are greeted by Saori Shibuki who tells them that they have already "entered their game". The game is 'Three of Clubs' named 'Good Fortune Bad Fortune' where they have to answer obscure questions and if they get it wrong flaming arrows are shot at them. Karube and Shibuki argue, causing Chota to have to guess the answer quickly and have arrows fired at them. The questions continue, and Chota's leg is severely burned, but apart from that all four escape. Shibuki reveals to them that, in Borderland, they must play games to survive, with the number of each game the number of days they have until they have to play another game. Shibuki arrived in the Borderlands several days earlier where she played 'Two of Hearts' and was the only survivor, traumatising her. Due to Chota's injury, Shibuki volunteers to stay behind to tend to him whilst the other two go into the 'Five of Spades', other players include climber Yuzuha Usagi and sly player Shuntaro Chishiya. Only those four survive the game, with Arisu and Usagi managing to complete it together. Arisu, Karube, Chota and Shibuki enter the 'Seven of Hearts' game where it's revealed only one can survive, the other three all decide sacrifice themselves for Arisu. As Arisu remains in despair, he meets Usagi again, she takes pity on him and they decide to partner up.

The pair begin looking for the 'Beach' which was a place Karube had discovered before his demise. They discover and are forced to join the ranks of the "Beach", which is a large hotel inhabited with players run by the "Mad Hatter" who wishes to collect all the cards from the game's deck and believes that collecting them would bring them back to their world. Several games later however, the Mad Hatter is killed and the Beach is turned into the game stage for the Ten of Hearts, the final game of the first stage. Following the clearance of the game, the gamemasters reveal themselves and announce a second stage, where they have to compete in games of the face cards to complete the Borderlands.

Characters

Main
 / Alice

A video-game obsessed third year high school student (24-year-old in the Netfix series) who "does not fit in with his family". Due to his addictions in video games, he was shown to be a skilled analyzer, solving puzzles and pattern on the games and specializes in playing heart games.
 / The Rabbit

A mountain climber who was transported into the Borderlands shortly after the death of her father, whom she deeply respected. Usagi teams up with Arisu shortly after the deaths of his friends. Due to her experience in mountain climbing, she specializes in spade games. In the sequel manga Retry set few years after the series, she and Arisu are married and are expecting their first child together.

The Borderlands

Arisu's Friends
 / The Walrus

A highschooler (bartender in the Netflix series) and friend of Arisu and Chōta. In the Netflix series, Karube was preparing to propose to a woman he worked with at a bar, who happened to be the lover of his boss whilst in the Manga he was single and owned a bar despite his age.
 / The Carpenter

A highschooler (IT technician in the Netflix series) and friend of Arisu and Karube. He is immature and slightly perverted, although he means well and is loyal to his friends. In the Netflix series, he is sensible, highly religious and under pressure due to his mother taking his money for her cult. Chōta severely burns his leg while participating in a game, and as a result, slows down his friends while recovering.

Players

The first person Arisu and his friends encounter while in the deserted city. In the manga, Shibuki is a determined and impatient player who genuinely cared about the others, especially Chota. She also actively chooses to sacrifice herself for Arisu. In the Netflix adaptation, Shibuki is presented as a smart and skilled player who helps the group get past their first game. However, she is later revealed to be manipulative to get what she wants.
 / The Cheshire Cat

A mysterious, quiet, and sly player who teams up with Kuina to steal Hatter's deck of cards, the leader and founder of "the Beach", believing that a full deck would transport them out of the empty city. He later becomes interested in Arisu and Usagi after helping them escape a game of "Tag".
 / The Caterpillar

A member of the Beach who works with Chishiya to steal the deck of cards; however, the two fall out when he betrays them, so she abandons him in favor of working with Arisu and Usagi. In the Netflix series, the two never fall out and she constantly asks people if he is okay after they are separated. A former clothing shop clerk, she is revealed to be transgender, and was disowned by her father.

A young mechanic who is saved by Arisu during a game and later becomes his ally. He later sacrifices himself to save Arisu and the others during the King of Clubs game.
 / The March Hare

A highschooler with a special affinity for archery who later partners with Dodo and Aguni. She lost her leg in the first game she participated in.
 / The Dodo Bird
A highschooler Arisu saves in the Four of Hearts game who later partners with Aguni and Akane, who he grows close with. He is the only major character that was never adapted in the Netflix series.

Beach
/

A former hatter and the leader and founder of "the Beach", a hotel inhabited by dozens of players. His main goal is to collect all the playing cards given to players for winning games. He later went mad due to his various attempts to escape the game and after a planned plot, deliberately gets himself killed by Aguni to relieve him of his despair. 
 / The Knave of Hearts

A strong fighter and Hatter's best friend, Aguni is first introduced as an important member of "the Beach". He is in charge of a violent group at the beach titled "The Militants". After the death of the Hatter and the "Witch Hunt" game, he ventures out alone, later meeting and teaming up with Akane and Dodo. 
 / The White Queen

An executive member of "the Beach" who attempts to win difficult games through rational thinking. Ann is one of the key players in the "Witch Hunt" game. She later teams up with Arisu and Kuina. 
 / The Jub Jub Bird

A young yet dangerous member of "the Beach", described as being "aggressive due to his complicated past". He is a part of "the Militants". He was severely injured by Cheshiya and Aguni during the "Witch Hunt" game and harbors a deep hatred for Chishiya and Arisu. However, he begrudgingly teams up with Arisu during the King of Clubs game, in which he ventures out alone at the end.

Gamemasters
 / The Queen of Hearts

One of the four main gamemasters: The Queen of Hearts of the borderlands. A mysterious woman with an "elegant presence", she first appeared as an executive member of "the Beach". The only female main gamemaster. Unlike other gamemasters who are just civilians playing the roles for the borderlands, she seems to be the only one who knows the true origins of the Borderlands. She is later defeated by Arisu. 
 / The King of Diamonds

One of the four main gamemasters: The King of Diamonds of the borderlands, who is a former failed lawyer struggling to find equality in life. Like Mira, he also first appeared as an executive member of "the Beach". He is the most cunning and smartest of the gamemasters. He is later defeated by Chishiya. 
 / The King of Clubs

One of the four main gamemasters: The King of Clubs of the borderlands, who is a nudist and a former musician in a band with his group who leads the Osmosis game. The most laid-back and humane of the gamemasters, he is the only gamemaster who Arisu deeply respects. He is later defeated by Arisu. 
 / The King of Spades

One of the four main gamemasters: The King of Spades of the borderlands, who is a mercenary and an ex-special forces member who leads the Survival game. He is the most combative and physically powerful gamemaster. His name was never revealed in the Netflix series, in which after many attempts by Arisu and his friends, he is shot and killed by Aguni in a final struggle.

Others

The protagonist of the spin-off/prequel series Alice on Border Road, she is a high schooler in Tokyo who participates in the softball team representing her school, who gets transported to the borderlands during a trip to Kyoto and becomes the Queen of Hearts in possession of its card.
"Joker"
An unknown entity that is revealed to be the creator of the Borderlands holding the Joker card. In the manga, he made a brief appearance to Arisu moments before he gets teleported back home, asking him whether he is a God or a Devil, to which Arisu responds he is an "Intermediator". Following the reveal that the Borderland is a concept of purgatory, it is implied that the "Joker" may be a grim reaper, setting the games as a choice to find out whether the players have a strong will to live or not. He was never revealed in the Netflix series, but his Joker card was teased at the final shot of the scene.

Media

Manga
Alice in Borderland, written and illustrated by Haro Aso, was serialized in Shogakukan's Shōnen Sunday S magazine from November 25, 2010, to March 25, 2015, and later moved to Weekly Shōnen Sunday on April 8, 2015, and finished on March 2, 2016. Shogakukan collected its 65 individual chapters into eighteen tankōbon volumes, published from April 18, 2011, to April 18, 2016.

On July 9, 2021, Viz Media announced that they licensed the series for English publication. It is being published in a two-in-one volume edition, with the first volume published on March 15, 2022.

Spin-offs
Six side stories, later included in the main series volumes, were published in Weekly Shōnen Sunday from 2013 to 2015:
 (July 11–25, 2012)
 (January 16–23, 2013)
 (May 22–29, 2013)
 (August 21–September 4, 2013)
 (December 11, 2013–June 18, 2014)
 (October 15, 2014–February 4, 2015)

A spin-off series, titled , written by Aso and illustrated by Takayoshi Kuroda, was published in Shogakukan's seinen manga magazine Monthly Sunday Gene-X from August 19, 2015, to February 19, 2018. Shogakukan compiled its chapters into eight tankōbon volumes, published from January 18, 2016, to March 19, 2017.

Another series, titled , was serialized in Weekly Shōnen Sunday from October 14, 2020, to January 20, 2021. Shogakukan collected its chapters in two tankōbon volumes, released on December 11, 2020, and February 18, 2021.

Volume list

Alice in Borderland

Alice on Border Road

Alice in Borderland: Retry

Original video animation
The series was adapted into a three-episode original video animation (OVA) produced by Silver Link and Connect and directed by Hideki Tachibana. The first OVA episode was bundled with the limited edition of the 12th volume of the manga on October 17, 2014. The second OVA episode was bundled with the limited edition of the 13th volume of the manga on December 18, 2014. The third and last OVA episode was bundled with the limited edition of the 14th volume of the manga on February 18, 2015. The opening theme is "NEXTAGE", performed by the Japanese female idol group i☆Ris.

Sentai Filmworks licensed the OVAs for international distribution. MVM Entertainment licensed the OVA in the United Kingdom and Ireland.

Live-action series

An eight-episode live-action series, produced by Netflix and directed by Shinsuke Satō, premiered on December 10, 2020, in over 190 countries worldwide simultaneously. It stars Kento Yamazaki as Ryōhei Arisu and Tao Tsuchiya as Yuzuha Usagi. On December 24, 2020, a second season was announced, which premiered on December 22, 2022.

Reception
As of March 2016, Alice in Borderland had over 1.3 million copies in circulation. Volume 11 reached the 48th place on the weekly Oricon manga charts and, as of June 22, 2014, has sold 21,496 copies.

References

External links
  
  
 

Connect (studio)
Fiction about death games
Horror anime and manga
Manga adapted into television series
Seinen manga
Sentai Filmworks
Shogakukan franchises
Shogakukan manga
Shōnen manga
Silver Link
Supernatural anime and manga
Survival anime and manga
Suspense anime and manga
Viz Media manga